'Kadiyala' is the  surname  of those belonging to the Kamma caste. People belonging to the Kadiyala group are mostly from East Godavari district, West Godavari district, Chittoor district, the areas of Mustabad, Katuru, and Gudivada in the Krishna district and Guntur district of Andhra Pradesh.

Mustabada is a small farming village in Krishna District and is about 15 km from Vijayawada, the largest city in the Krishna district of Andhra Pradesh. The Kadiyalas were mostly a farming community with farm lands in and around the Krishna River basin and were prosperous in growing rice, tobacco and other crops.

The Kadiyala people originated from Mustabad in the Krishna District of Andhra Pradesh. There is also another view based on oral history that the Kadiyala people migrated from Guntur district to the villages of Katuru and Mustabad in Krishna district sometime in the 19th century. More specifically, Kadiyalas have settled in the area of Katuru, and may have been living there for more than a century. 

There are many Kadiyala people that live in Kagupadu, West Godavari district that have been there from 300-plus years, hailing from Mustabad.

Apart from Kadiyalas from Kagupadu, Guntur, Katuru, and Mustabad, there are Kadiyalas from East Godavari district. They are all Brahmin Kadiyalas, hailing from Visweswarayapuram, having been there for over 700-plus years. Antarvedi, the place where the Godavari river merges with the Bay of Bengal, is 20 km away from this place.

There are around 100+ plus families with Kadiyala Surname living in the village named Yallamandaయలౢమ౦ద nearby Narasaraopet In Guntur Dt.

References

 
   The section heading referenced here reads "Kadiyala, Cadiyala", suggesting these to be the most common variants at the time (1901).
 
 
 Cottle, Basil. Penguin Dictionary of Surnames. Baltimore, MD: Penguin Books, 1967.
 Dorward, David. Indian Surnames. Collins Celtic (Pocket edition), 1998.
  
 
 
 The URL here is to a reprint on the Irish Ancestors website.  Tables of contents for back issues of Irish Roots Magazine are found at https://web.archive.org/web/20091217104309/http://irishroots.ie/Back%20Issues%20List.htm and there are two listings for the title here, one in 'Issue No. 26 (1998 Second quarter)', the other in 'Issue No. 48 (2003 Fourth quarter)'.  It is not clear whether the latter is a simple reprint of the former or an update.  The reprinted article notes 'From Irish Roots, (No. 28)'.
 
 Smith, Elsdon C. American Surnames. Genealogical Publishing Company, 1997.
  
 US Census Bureau (May 9, 1995). s:1990 Census Name Files dist.all.last (1-100). Retrieved on February 25, 2008.

External links
Kadiyala SurnameDNA Project
Origin and history of the name of Kadiyala, with biographies of all the most noted persons of that name, Chicago, Ill., American Publishers' Association, 1902. via Internet Archive

Surnames

ru:Смит